The Aylesbury Vale Academy, formerly Quarrendon School, was Buckinghamshire's first Academy. It is a Church of England Academy with the Anglican Diocese of Oxford as the primary sponsor and Buckinghamshire Council as a co-sponsor.

The academy's catchment area comprises parts of north Aylesbury, including Quarrendon, Elmhurst and Watermead, as well as the villages of Hardwick, Weedon, Whitchurch, Oving and  Pitchcott. It also includes both the Berryfields and Weedon Hill developments.

History
Quarrendon County Secondary School was officially opened by the Duke of Edinburgh. on 13 June 1958. It was later known as Quarrendon Upper School and finally as Quarrendon School. Quarrendon School officially closed on 10 July 2009.

Quarrendon School was placed on special measures, for the second time in five years, in September 2004.The school came out of special measures in November 2006, after making satisfactory progress. In 2007, the school was planning to apply to DCSF to become a specialist Science and Technology College.

The school's sixth form reopened in September 2008.

Buckinghamshire County Council originally planned to close the school in 2009, and to move to a new site, built as part of the Berryfields Major Development Area (MDA), with housing replacing the school on the current site. However, in 2006 there was some doubt as to whether this would happen due to funding issues.

In 2007 it was proposed that Quarrendon would become a Church Academy, jointly funded and controlled by the Local Authority and the Church of England. It was also proposed that Brunel University, would become a partner.

The proposal was accepted in November 2008. Quarrendon became The Aylesbury Vale Academy in 2009 and had £1.5m invested in it over the next few years. Pupils and staff at the school automatically transferred to the new Academy. The Academy staff and students transferred to the new building in September 2013.

The school later opened a primary department.

Site 

The Quarrendon site was made up of a series of blocks.

 Science block, built in 1971, with Humanities on the first floor and the school Library
 English block, opened in 1975, also contains the Sports Hall, Dance/Performing Arts studios and SEN study centre
 Administration block with Gymnasium, Assembly Hall, Canteen, main reception and headteachers office
 Tower block for modern foreign languages, Mathematics, Business Studies and ICT
 Technology block
 Music block

Most of which have now been demolished after the academy moved to Berryfields.

The new building in Berryfields consists of one building for the academy and one for the Berryfields primary school next to it.

Links with other schools and colleges 
The Aylesbury Vale Academy has  close links with Mandeville Upper School in Aylesbury as part of the Aylesbury School Sports Partnership. The Academy is also a member of the Aylesbury Vale Leading Edge Partnership which includes The Grange School and Waddesdon Church of England School.

The academy also has close links with Aylesbury College, and sends students there weekly.

The academy also maintains links with its feeder primary schools and hosts an annual primary schools sports day.

Notable alumni 
Emmerson Boyce, footballer
Jennifer Gadirova and Jessica Gadirova Olympic medalist gymnasts

References

External links
Department for Education Performance Tables 2011

Aylesbury
Secondary schools in Buckinghamshire
Academies in Buckinghamshire
Church of England secondary schools in the Diocese of Oxford
Educational institutions established in 2009
2009 establishments in England
Primary schools in Buckinghamshire